David Nutt (3 April 1810 – 28 November 1863) was a British book publisher and bookseller.

Career
Nutt was born David Samuel Nutt in London in 1810. After attending Merchant Taylor's School, he worked for several years as a clerk with a mercantile firm in London. One of that firm's partners, Edward Moberley, encouraged Nutt to start out as a bookseller. That suggestion was supported by Adolphus Asher, a bibliographer and seller of rare books based in Berlin, who offered him a commission to represent him in London.

Nutt accepted the commission and began bookselling some time between 1829 and 1833. His first place of business was 90 Bartholomew Close, London and he would later move his premises to 58 Fleet Street, London, and then in 1848 to 270–271 Strand, London.

He characterised himself variously as a "foreign and classical bookseller" and a "theological and foreign bookseller" and concentrated on the sale of imported foreign books in many of the modern and ancient European and Asian languages. Apart from books then currently in print, he also sold rare books to clients which included the libraries of the British Museum and Oxford and Cambridge universities and private collectors such as George Spencer, 2nd Earl Spencer and Thomas Grenville. In the catalogues he wrote and published to sell his books, Nutt demonstrated antiquarian and bibliographical knowledge which led to their being referenced in bibliographies written by Jacques Charles Brunet and Johann G. T. Graesse.

The firm began publishing books in the 1830s. His publishing specialities were books published for the foreign (especially German) market, as well as religious educational, antiquarian, literary and scholarly texts.

In 1851, David Nutt entered a partnership with the German-English publisher, bookseller and linguist Nicholas Trübner.

The David Nutt firm in later years
Alfred Nutt was David's eldest and only surviving son. In 1878 he took over the David Nutt firm, expanded it considerably, and added books on folklore and antiquities to its list of publications. At the turn of the century The Modern Language Quarterly was also published by the firm for the Modern Language Association (Great Britain).

In 1890 the firm moved to a new address at 57-59 Long Acre, "At the Sign of the Phoenix" and in 1912 moved again, to Grape Street, New Oxford Street, London.<ref>Nutt, Alfred Trübner, Dictionary of National Biography, 1912 Supplement. Retrieved 25 October 2021.</ref>

After Alfred's sudden death in 1910, his wife M. L. Nutt became the proprietor. She continued to publish new authors including the poet Robert Frost and the firm became the latter's first publisher when it published his poetry collections A Boy's Will (1913) and North of Boston (1914).

Financial difficulties forced Mrs. Nutt to sell the firm to Simpkin, Marshall, Hamilton Kent and Company in 1916.

Personal life
David Nutt married Ellen Clementina Carter, the daughter of Robert Carter and granddaughter of William Miller whose publishing house was a predecessor of John Murray.

In 1864 Ellen was listed under her married name of Ella Clementina Nutt as the London representative of the German book trade.

David Nutt died at his residence in 1863.

Book series
 The Ancient East Series
 Argyllshire Series
 Arthurian Romances Unrepresented in Malory's Morte d'Arthur
 Art Lover's Series
 Bibliothèque de CarabasBibliothèque de Carabas (David Nutt) - Book Series List, publishinghistory.com. Retrieved 26 October 2021.
 Country Folk-lore
 Cymmrodorion Record Series
 English History by Contemporary Writers
 Grimm Library
 Method Gaspey-Otto-Sauer
 The Modern Linguist
 New York University Ottendorfer Memorial Series of Germanice Monographs
 Northern Library
 Nutt’s Conversation DictionariesPhrasebooks for the Silk Road, languagehat.com. Retrieved 22 February 2021.
 Nutt's Juvenile Library
 Phonetic Series
 Pilgrim Players Series
 Popular Studies in Mythology, Romance & Folklore
 Publications of the Folk-lore Society
 Scottish History from Contemporary Writers
 The Tudor Library
 The Tudor Translations
 Waifs and Strays of Celtic Tradition
 Woman Citizen's Series

References

Further reading
 Crys Armbrust, "David Nutt (1829-1916)", in: Patricia J. Anderson and Jonathan Rose, British Literary Publishing Houses, 1820-1880, Detroit and London: Gale Research, Inc., 1991 (Dictionary of Literary Biography, vol. 106), pp. 228–229.

External links
 David Nutt, A catalogue of theological books in foreign languages, including the sacred writings ...'', London: David Nutt, 1857.

British book publishers (people)
British booksellers
1810 births
1863 deaths
Year of birth unknown
Book publishing companies of England